Broxa is a village in the Scarborough district of North Yorkshire, England, within the North York Moors National Park.

Whilst some 12th century documents mention Broxa (in relation to land granted by the abbot of Whitby), the village was not listed in the Domesday Book. It is thought that it was included in the manor of Hackness. The name of the village derives from a personal name Broce, meaning the enclosure of Broce's people.

To the north of the village is Broxa Forest, a  woodland maintained by Forestry England which has walking and cycling trails. The Moors to Sea Cycle route passes  through the village and the forest.

References

External links

Villages in North Yorkshire